Leonardsville may refer to:
Leonardsville Township, Minnesota
Leonardville, New Jersey
Leonardsville, New York